Travis Santo Raciti (born May 21, 1992) is an American football defensive end  who is currently a free agent. He played college football at San Jose State and was signed by the Philadelphia Eagles as an undrafted free agent in 2015.

Early life and college playing career
Raciti was born in Antioch, California and graduated from College Park High School in nearby Pleasant Hill in 2010. At College Park, Raciti lettered in football.  On the football team, Raciti was the long snapper in addition to five other positions, including tight end and defensive tackle. He was a second-team all-state selection in 2009.

Raciti was recruited as a tight end and defensive end prospect in Mike MacIntyre's first recruiting class at San Jose State University. After redshirting the 2010 season, Raciti immediately joined the starting defensive lineup. In 12 games in 2011, Raciti started 9 and had 26 tackles, 3.5 tackles for loss, and one quarterback sack. He also recovered two fumbles, and both recoveries led to offensive scoring afterwards.

In 2012, the season San Jose State won the Military Bowl, Raciti started all 13 games and had 52 tackles, 13.0 tackles for loss, and 8.5 sacks. Raciti earned first-team All-Western Athletic Conference honors.

As a junior in 2013, Raciti started 11 of 12 games. He led all linemen on the team, with 37 tackles, 4.0 tackles for loss, and 2.0 sacks. He also blocked two extra point kicks.

Raciti, a three-time academic all-conference honoree (WAC in 2011 and 2012, MWC in 2013), completed his bachelor's degree in communication studies in May 2014. Along with future NFL draft pick Akeem King, Raciti was one of eight graduate students on the 2014 San Jose State team. Raciti started all 12 games of his senior season in 2014. With 72 tackles on the season, Raciti had the most tackles among all Mountain West Conference (MWC) defensive linemen. He also led San Jose State in tackles for loss (6.5) and sacks (3.0), defended one pass, and forced a fumble. Raciti was a second-team All-MWC selection.

Professional career

Philadelphia Eagles
Raciti signed as an undrafted free agent with the Philadelphia Eagles on May 2, 2015. He was released on September 5, 2015 and was signed to the Eagles practice squad on September 15, 2015.  He signed a reserve/future contract with the Eagles on January 4, 2016 but was released on May 5, 2016.

Minnesota Vikings
Raciti was signed by the Minnesota Vikings on May 23, 2016. On September 3, 2016, he was released by the Vikings as part of final roster cuts.

Denver Broncos
On December 8, 2016, Raciti was signed to the Denver Broncos' practice squad. He signed a reserve/future contract with the Broncos on January 2, 2017. On April 5, 2017, he was waived by the Broncos.

References

External links
 Philadelphia Eagles Player bio
 San Jose State Spartans Player bio

1992 births
Living people
American football defensive tackles
People from Antioch, California
Players of American football from California
San Jose State Spartans football players
Sportspeople from the San Francisco Bay Area
Philadelphia Eagles players
Minnesota Vikings players
Denver Broncos players